Luis Roberto Guzmán (born April 9, 1973) is a Puerto Rican actor known for his performances in Mexican telenovelas like Alborada, and for his title role in Mexican series El Pantera. Guzmán also worked on the film Ladies' Night in 2003.

Early life
Early in his life Guzmán wanted to enter Menudo, but was unable to do it, eventually forming friendships with several former members. He subsequently studied in the University of Puerto Ricoʻs campus in Río Piedras. After completing his studies in the institutionʻs Department of Drama, Guzmán moved to Mexico in 1999, interested in pursuing a career in the telenovela industry. Although he works most of the time in Mexico, Guzmán often travels to Puerto Rico to rest.

Acting career
In Mexico, Guzmán received a contract with Televisa. Guzmán has expressed that the most important role of his career is as El Pantera in the TV series of the same name. In his youth Guzmán was a follower of several fictional superheroes, including Atom Ant and ThunderCats, which influenced his acceptance for the role. Guzmán has expressed that he would like to act in more telenovelas produced in Puerto Rico, but feels that Puerto Rican television needs to reduce the number of foreign productions. He also noted that he would like to work on the island after the production of El Pantera.

On June 26, 2013, it was confirmed that Luis Roberto Guzmán (along with Angelique Boyer and Sebastián Rulli) will star in Angelli Nesma's Lo Que La Vida Me Robó, a remake of Ernesto Alonso's Bodas de odio produced in 1983.

Musical career
Guzmán released Bipolar, his first musical production, in 2008. The album was originally released in Mexico, intending a 2009 release for Puerto Rico and the United States.

Filmography

Films

Television

See also
 List of Puerto Ricans

References

External links

Living people
People from Cayey, Puerto Rico
Puerto Rican male film actors
Puerto Rican male television actors
1973 births
20th-century Puerto Rican male actors
21st-century Puerto Rican male actors
University of Puerto Rico alumni